XHPAT-FM was a noncommercial radio station on 106.5 FM in Pátzcuaro, Michoacán. It was owned by Medios Radiofónicos Michoacán through permitholder Flavio René Acevedo and carries its  format, which was carried on MRM's three permit stations in the state.

XHPAT received its permit on August 1, 2012. MRM turned in the social concession and that of XHCHM-FM Ciudad Hidalgo on January 8, 2020, citing the state of the regional economy.

References

Radio stations in Michoacán
2012 establishments in Mexico
2020 disestablishments in Mexico
Defunct radio stations in Mexico
Radio stations established in 2012
Radio stations disestablished in 2020